Sailana is a town in the Malwa region of the Indian state of Madhya Pradesh.
Sailana was once the capital of the Sailana State before it merged into India. A fort belonging to the former royal family still stands tall in Sailana.

Demographics

As of the 2011 Census of India, Sailana had a population of 1,34,959. There are 226 villages in Sailana block. Sailana has an average literacy rate of 86%, higher than the state average of 69%: male literacy is 93%, and female literacy is 78%. In Sailana, 11% of the population is under 6 years of age. The sub-district has a high population of Scheduled tribes (81.77%).

Geography
It has an average elevation of 479 metres (1,571 feet).

Foundation of Sailana
Raja Jai Singh wanted to shift his capital from Raoti to a safer location, he ordered the construction of his new capital close to the Kedareshwar temple and named it Jesnagar. While Jai Singh halted there with the intention of building a town, the god Kedareshwar appeared in his dream and told him that his temple was just below the hill on which Jesnagar stood, and the sewage of the new town would flow over the temple and defile it and he must therefore move east, selecting the spot on which he should kill and bury game. The god promised him that the town founded there would be healthy and prosperous. Accordingly, Raja Jai Singh rode out eastwards until he found a hare which he pierced with his spear and buried on the spot where the great Palace gate called Suraj Pole now stands. Raja Jai Singh named his new capital "Sailana" from its location at the foot of the hills (in Sanskrit, anana means mouth and shaila means hills).

History
Sailana State was founded by Raja Jai Singh Rathore, great-grandson of Maharaja Ratan Singh Rathore. In 1716 Jai singh took revenge against his uncle for the murder of his father, he killed him in a pitched battle at sagode and secured Ratlam for his elder brother. The two brothers then divided the state between themselves. Jai singh's capital was initially at Raoti. He built Sailana town as his new capital in 1736. He fought 22 battles in his lifetime, turning Sailana into an independent state.

Royal Cuisine

In the days of the Princely era, Sailana was famous for its hospitality, cuisine and liquor. The tradition was started by Raja Sir Dilip Singh K.C.I.E of Sailana and was elaborated by his son Raja Digvijaya Singh. The Rajas of Sailana excelled in the culinary arts and invented many unique recipes apart from collecting recipes of bygone era from the Nizam of Hyderabad, Maharaja of Kashmir and Begum of Bhopal amongst others, from where emanated the most exotic culinary recipes. The recipes were translated from ancient recipe books in Sanskrit, Urdu and Persian to ensure that these recipes were preserved for posterity. The current head of the family, Vikram Singh, has a collection of more than 2,000 ancient recipes out of which only 164 have been made public through the cookbook, "Cooking Delights of the Maharajas" written by the former ruler of Sailana, Digvijay Singh.

Cactus Garden
The Sailana Cactus garden was built by Raja Digvijay Singh in 1960. The garden is behind the Sailana Palace and has rare species of cactus. It was the first of its kind in India and once had the biggest collection of cacti in Asia.

Kedareshwar Temples
The Kedareshwar temples (Bada Kedareshwar and Chota Kedareshwar) of Lord Shiva are famous in Sailana, there are two of them, both are 4 km from the fort in opposite directions. The temples are situated in man made caves carved out from a cliff of igneous rocks. The initial structure of Bada Kedareshwar was built by Raja Jai Singh (r.1736 – 1757), Raja Duleh Singh (r.1850 – 1895) later spent Rs.150,000 on the temple and built several structures in and around the temple including a man-made lake that flows over the temple. Chota Kedareshwar is built on a cliff which is surrounded by a small valley. From the top of the cliff, a small stream of monsoon rain water forms a waterfall and joins a small pond of water in the valley. From here a river originates and flows down into the plains of Rajasthan.

Sailana Kharmour Bird Sanctuary

The Kharmour Bird Sanctuary, also known as Sailana Bird Sanctuary, is situated in Sailana Village of the Ratlam District. This sanctuary is spread in a total area of 13 km2 and was established in 1983. This sanctuary is home to and is named after the 'Kharmour' bird, a very rare species; and it is also a major stop for a wide variety of migratory birds. It is also one of the breeding habitats of Lesser Florican in India. The famous ornithologist Salim Ali visited the sanctuary and spotted 89 species of birds. This sanctuary is part of the Khathiar-Gir dry deciduous forests ecoregion.

Education
The Government College in Sailana was founded in 1989. It is affiliated to Vikram University, Ujjain.

Travelling distance from Sailana
The nearest city is Ratlam, 19 km from Sailana. Distances from other major places are,

See also
 Sailana State
 Sailana (Vidhan Sabha constituency)
 Rathor Dynasty

External links
 
 Sailana Palace

References

Cities in Malwa
Cities and towns in Ratlam district
Khathiar-Gir dry deciduous forests